The Pueblo Arcade is a historic building in Vero Beach, Florida. Located at 2044 14th Street, the Pueblo Arcade was built in the Mission/Spanish Revival style in 1926 by local contractors Blackford and Davis. This structure was very popular among the citizens of Vero Beach due to its ingenious design, prior to the introduction of Air Conditioning. It consisted of arcades with shop doorways opening onto a single hallway which opened to the street. The structure was restored by developer Robert L. Brackett and was added to the U.S. National Register of Historic Places on March 8, 1997.  Prior to renovation, the location served as the flagship store for DuBose Jewelers, a regional jewelry store chain which opened in Vero in 1912.

References

External links

 Indian River County listings at National Register of Historic Places
 Florida's Office of Cultural and Historical Programs
 Indian River County listings
 Pueblo Arcade

National Register of Historic Places in Indian River County, Florida
Buildings and structures in Vero Beach, Florida